This article presents detailed results of the 2009 Japanese general election. It lists all elected Representatives in the 300 single-member districts and the 11 regional proportional representation (PR) blocks. The top PR block replacement candidates to be elected later without vote in cases of death, resignation or disqualification (kuriage-tōsen) are also listed, by-elections are not.

Party names are abbreviated as follows (format: abbreviation, translated name, Japanese name, English name):
 Ruling coalition
 LDP Liberal Democratic Party, Jiyūminshutō
 Kōmeitō "Justice Party", Kōmeitō, New Justice Party Party
 JRP "Reform Club", Kaikaku Club, Japan Renaissance Party (cooperated without inclusion in the cabinet)
 Opposition parties
 DPJ "Democratic Party", Minshutō, Democratic Party of Japan
 JCP Japanese Communist Party, Nihon Kyōsantō
 SDP Social Democratic Party, Shakaiminshutō
 YP "Everybody's Party", Minna no Tō, Your Party
 PNP People's New Party, Kokuminshintō
 NPN New Party Nippon, Shintō Nippon
 NPD New Party Daichi, Shintō Daichi
 Other minor parties with candidates: HRP Happiness Realization Party, Honshitsu "New Party 'The Essential'", WECP World Economic Community Party, Freeway "New Party Freeway Club", Smile "Japan Smile Party", Rinkai "Forest and Ocean Party"

Hokkaidō

Tōhoku

Northern Kantō

Southern Kantō

Tōkyō

Hokuriku-Shin'etsu

Tōkai 

Note that due to undernomination and disqualifications of PR candidates concurrently running in a district but failing to obtain one tenth of the district vote, one seat in Tōkai were reassigned from the original election result d'Hondt distribution; the number of seats each party would have received under the original distribution is given in parentheses.

Kinki 

Note that due to undernomination and disqualifications of PR candidates concurrently running in a district but failing to obtain one tenth of the district vote, several seats in Kinki were reassigned from the original d'Hondt distribution according to vote shares; the number of seats each party would have received under the original distribution is given in parentheses.

Chūgoku

Shikoku

Kyūshū

References 
 Ministry of Internal Affairs and Communications: Official result
 Yomiuri Shimbun: 2009 general election results

2009 elections in Japan
General elections in Japan
Election results in Japan